Steve Pearce is the name of:

Steve Pearce (politician) (born 1947), American politician
Steve Pearce (baseball) (born 1983), American baseball player
Stephen Pearce (1819–1904), English painter

See also
Steve Piearce (born 1974), English footballer
Stevo Pearce (born 1962), English record label executive
Steven Pierce (disambiguation)
Stephen Pears (born 1962), English footballer